Elsie is the debut studio album by The Horrible Crowes, a Gaslight Anthem side-project made up of Ian Perkins and Gaslight Anthem founder Brian Fallon. It was released on September 6, 2011, through SideOneDummy Records.

Singles
Elsie'''s lead single, "Behold the Hurricane," was released July 19, 2011.

Critical receptionElsie received mostly positive reviews from music critics. At Metacritic, the album has an average score of 76 out of 100, which indicates "generally favorable reviews" based on 15 reviews.

Andrew Leahey of AllMusic rated the album four out of five stars with this comment: "Elsie functions best as a display of Fallon’s underused bottom register and acoustic songwriting skills, proving that slowing things down once in a while can still be a punk rock move." Writing for Alternative Press, Scott Heisel writes Elsie'' is "better than just about everything the Gaslight Anthem have done to date. Perfect for night drives on long, winding roads."

Track listing
Adapted from AllMusic

Personnel
Credits adapted from AllMusic

Musicians
 Brian Fallon – guitar, Hammond B3, percussion, piano, vocals
 Ian Perkins – bass, guitar, slide guitar
 Hollie Fallon – Hammond B3
 Ben Horowitz – timpani
 Ted Hutt – guitar
 Adele Jensen – trumpet
 The Parkington Sisters – accordion, strings, vocals
 Alex Rosamilia – guitar
 Steve Sidelnyk – drums, percussion

Technical
 Tom Baker – mastering
 Danny Clinch – photography
 Joseph DeMaio – assistant engineer
 Ted Hutt – mixing, production
 Ryan Mall – engineer, mixing
 Steve Sidelnyk – programming

Chart performance

Release history
Source: Amazon.com

References

2011 debut albums
Albums produced by Ted Hutt